A translator or programming language processor is a generic term that can refer to a compiler, assembler, or interpreter—anything that converts code from one computer language into another. These include translations between high-level and human-readable computer languages such as C++ and Java, intermediate-level languages such as Java bytecode, low-level languages such as the assembly language and machine code, and between similar levels of language on different computing platforms, as well as from any of these to any other of these. The term is also used for translators between software implementations and hardware/ASIC  microchip implementations of the same program, and from software descriptions of a microchip to the logic gates needed to build it.

Examples of widely used types of computer language translators include interpreters, compilers and decompilers, assemblers and disassemblers.

See also
 Binary translator (binary-to-binary, typically code)
 Assembly language translator (low-level source-to-source, code)
 Source-to-source translator (high-level source-to-source, code)
 Rewriter (source-to-source, typically code)
 File converter (binary-to-binary, typically data)
 Transcoder (binary-to-binary, data)

References

Further reading 
  (2+xiv+270+6 pages)
 
 
 

Programming language implementation